N. Surendran s/o K. Nagarajan (Tamil: ந. சுரெந்திரன்), commonly referred to as N. Surendran, is a Malaysian lawyer and politician. He was the Member of the Parliament of Malaysia for the Padang Serai constituency in the state of Kedah for one term from 2013 to 2018. He is a member of the People's Justice Party (PKR), a component party of the Pakatan Harapan (PH) coalition.

Early life, education and legal career
Surendran was born in Kuantan, Pahang and raised in Alor Setar, Kedah. His late father was a postmaster, and he has three siblings. He obtained a Bachelor of Laws from the University of London and was admitted to the Malaysian Bar in 1994.

Surendran practiced as a human rights lawyer, taking on cases of deaths in custody and representing the Hindu Rights Action Force (HINDRAF). He co-founded Lawyers for Liberty (LFL) in 2011 and became the a key member of the group.

Politics 
In 2010 Surendran was appointed by Anwar Ibrahim as one of PKR's vice-presidents. The appointment was a surprise: Surendran was not a parliamentarian at the time and his selection was criticised by N. Gobalakrishnan, the then Padang Serai MP who had just lost a ballot for the vice presidency. He remained in the post until 2014, when he was defeated for re-election in a party ballot.

In the 2013 general election, Surendran contested the Padang Serai parliamentary seat for the PKR. Gobalakrishnan had won the seat for PKR in the previous election, but left the party to sit on the crossbench soon after his public attack on Surendran's appointment as a party vice-president. Surendran won the seat at the election, defeating four other candidates including Gobalakrishnan. Surendran had expressed surprise, travelling to Padang Serai from his home in Kuala Lumpur to campaign, at the extent of rural poverty there.

In November 2013, Surendran was suspended from the Parliament for six months. The government-dominated Parliament voted to suspend him on the ground of insulting the Speaker of the House of Representatives during a debate about the demolition of Hindu temples. In Jun 2014, Surendran notched up his fourth suspension from the Parliament amidst a debate on the Lynas Advanced Materials Plant. In August 2014, he was twice charged for sedition for criticising the overturning of opposition leader Anwar Ibrahim's acquittal on sodomy charges and alleging that the Prime Minister, Najib Razak, was "personally responsible" for Anwar's prosecution.

Surendran was dropped by PKR as candidate in 2018 general election.

Election results

References

See also

 List of Malaysian politicians of Indian origin

Date of birth missing (living people)
Living people
People from Pahang
Surendran
Malaysian human rights activists
20th-century Malaysian lawyers
People's Justice Party (Malaysia) politicians
Members of the Dewan Rakyat
Alumni of the University of London
21st-century Malaysian politicians
1966 births
21st-century Malaysian lawyers